The Linyuan Cingshueiyan Former Japanese Military Tunnel is a tunnel in Fongshan Hill, Linyuan District, Kaohsiung, Taiwan.

History
The tunnel was built in 1943 by the Imperial Japanese Army during the Japanese rule of Taiwan to fend off the landing of United States Armed Forces.

Geology
The tunnel stretches from Linnei Village through Fongshan Ciouling and ends in Fongbitou in Jhongmen Village. Part of the tunnel which is largely intact is around the Longpan Cave.

See also
 List of tourist attractions in Taiwan

References

1943 establishments in Taiwan
Tunnels completed in 1943
Tunnels in Kaohsiung